Edward St. John Gorey (February 22, 1925 – April 15, 2000) was an American writer, Tony Award-winning costume designer, and artist, noted for his own illustrated books as well as cover art and illustration for books by other writers. His characteristic pen-and-ink drawings often depict vaguely unsettling narrative scenes in Victorian and Edwardian settings.

Early life 
Edward St. John Gorey was born in Chicago. His parents, Helen Dunham (née Garvey) and Edward Leo Gorey, divorced in 1936 when he was 11. His father remarried in 1952 when he was 27. His stepmother was Corinna Mura (1910–1965), a cabaret singer who had a small role in Casablanca as the woman playing the guitar while singing "La Marseillaise" at Rick's Café Américain. His father was briefly a journalist. Gorey's maternal great-grandmother, Helen St. John Garvey, was a nineteenth-century greeting card illustrator, from whom he claimed to have inherited his talents.

From 1934 to 1937, Gorey attended public school in the Chicago suburb of Wilmette, Illinois, where his classmates included Charlton Heston, Warren MacKenzie, and Joan Mitchell. Some of his earliest preserved work appears in the Stolp School yearbook for 1937. After that, he attended the Francis W. Parker School in Chicago. He spent 1944 to 1946 in the Army at Dugway Proving Ground in Utah. He then attended Harvard University, beginning in 1946 and graduating in the class of 1950; he studied French and roomed with poet Frank O'Hara.  Starting in 1951, Gorey illustrated poetry books by Merrill Moore for Twayne Publishers including Case Record from a Sonnetorium (many illustrations by Gorey, 1951), and More Clinical Sonnets (1953).

In the early 1950s, Gorey, with a group of recent Harvard alumni including Alison Lurie (1947), John Ashbery (1949), Donald Hall (1951) and O'Hara (1950), amongst others, founded the Poets' Theatre in Cambridge, which was supported by Harvard faculty members John Ciardi and Thornton Wilder. 

He frequently stated that his formal art training was "negligible"; Gorey studied art for one semester at the School of the Art Institute of Chicago in 1943.

Career 

From 1953 to 1960, he lived in Manhattan and worked for the Art Department of Doubleday Anchor, where he illustrated book covers, added illustrations to text, and provided typographic design. He illustrated works as diverse as Bram Stoker's Dracula, H. G. Wells' The War of the Worlds, and T. S. Eliot's Old Possum's Book of Practical Cats. Throughout his career, he illustrated over 200 book covers for Doubleday Anchor, Random House's Looking Glass Library, Bobbs-Merrill, and as a freelance artist. In later years he produced cover illustrations and interior artwork for many children's books by John Bellairs, as well as books begun by Bellairs and continued by Brad Strickland after Bellairs' death.

His first independent work, The Unstrung Harp, was published in 1953. He also published under various pen names, some of which were anagrams of his first and last names, such as Ogdred Weary, Dogear Wryde, Ms. Regera Dowdy, and dozens more. His books also feature the names Eduard Blutig ("Edward Gory"), a German-language pun on his own name, and O. Müde (German for O. Weary).

At the prompting of Harry Stanton, an editor and vice president at Addison-Wesley, Gorey collaborated on a number of works, and continued a lifelong correspondence with Peter F. Neumeyer.

The New York Times credits bookstore owner Andreas Brown and his store, the Gotham Book Mart, with launching Gorey's career: "it became the central clearing house for Mr. Gorey, presenting exhibitions of his work in the store's gallery and eventually turning him into an international celebrity."

Gorey's illustrated (and sometimes wordless) books, with their vaguely ominous air and ostensibly Victorian and Edwardian settings, have long had a cult following.  He made a notable impact on the world of theater with his designs for the 1977 Broadway revival of Dracula, for which he won the Tony Award for Best Costume Design and was nominated for the Tony Award for Best Scenic Design. In 1980, Gorey became particularly well-known for his animated introduction to the PBS series Mystery! In the introduction of each Mystery! episode, host Vincent Price would welcome viewers to "Gorey Mansion".

Because of the settings and style of Gorey's work, many people have assumed he was British; in fact, he only left the U.S. once, for a visit to the Scottish Hebrides. In later years, he lived year-round in Yarmouth Port, Massachusetts, on Cape Cod, where he wrote and directed numerous evening-length entertainments, often featuring his own papier-mâché puppets, an ensemble known as Le Theatricule Stoique. The first of these productions, Lost Shoelaces, premiered in Woods Hole, Massachusetts on August 13, 1987. The last was The White Canoe: an Opera Seria for Hand Puppets, for which Gorey wrote the libretto, with a score by the composer Daniel James Wolf. Based on Thomas Moore's poem The Lake of the Dismal Swamp, the opera was staged after Gorey's death and directed by his friend, neighbor, and longtime collaborator Carol Verburg, with a puppet stage made by his friends and neighbors, the noted set designers Herbert Senn and Helen Pond. In the early 1970s, Gorey wrote an unproduced screenplay for a silent film, The Black Doll.

After Gorey's death, one of his executors, Andreas Brown, turned up a large cache of unpublished work - complete and incomplete. Brown described the find as "ample material for many future books and for plays based on his work".

Personal life 

Gorey was noted for his love of the New York City Ballet. He attended every performance for 25 years.

Although Gorey illustrated and wrote many children's books, he did not associate himself with children and had no particular fondness for them. Gorey never married, professed little interest in romance, and never discussed any specific romantic relationships in interviews. 

In Alexander Theroux's memoir of his friendship with Gorey, The Strange Case of Edward Gorey, published after Gorey's death, Theroux recalled that when Gorey was pressed on the matter of his sexual orientation by "a rude Boston Globe reporter," he replied, "I don't even know." Theroux is referring to Lisa Solod's interview with Gorey ("Edward Gorey: The Cape's master teller of macabre tales discusses death, decadence, and homosexuality"), which appeared in the September 1980 issue of Boston magazine, not the Globe. Gorey's exact words, in response to Solod's question, "What are your sexual preferences?" were, "Well, I'm neither one thing nor the other particularly. I suppose I'm gay. But I don't really identify with it much." At this point, Solod notes that he laughed. (Nowhere in the Solod interview does he say, "I don't even know.") Solod then asks, "Why not?" To which Gorey replies, "I am fortunate in that I am apparently reasonably undersexed or something. I do not spend my life picking up people on the streets. I was always reluctant to go to the movies with one of my friends because I always expected the police to come and haul him out of the loo at one point or the other. I know people who lead really outrageous lives. I've never said I was gay, and I've never said I wasn't. A lot of people would say that I wasn't because I never do anything about it." Shortly thereafter, he says, "What I'm trying to say is that I am a person before I am anything else."

Confusion and contention have arisen around the question of Gorey's sexuality for several reasons; chief among them is Gorey's general evasiveness in the face of any probing inquiry, by interviewers, into his inner life, especially his sexuality. But the omission of Gorey's remark "I suppose I'm gay" from the Solod interview when it appeared in Ascending Peculiarity, a collection of interviews with Gorey edited by the art critic Karen Wilkin and overseen by Gorey's de facto business manager Andreas Brown, has also helped to cloud the question.

Critic David Ehrenstein, writing in Gay City News, asserts that Gorey was discreet about his sexuality in what Ehrenstein calls the "Don’t Ask/ Don’t Tell era" of the 1950s. "Stonewall changed all that—making gay a discussable mainstream topic," writes Ehrenstein. "But it didn't change things for Gorey. To those in the know, his sensibility was clearly gay, but his sexual life was as covert as his self was overt." By contrast, the critic Gabrielle Bellot argues that Gorey, "when pressed by interviewers about his sexuality ... declined to give clear answers, except during a 1980 conversation with Lisa Solod, wherein he claimed to be asexual—making Gorey one of few openly asexual writers even today." (While Bellot interprets Gorey's answers as a declaration of asexuality, Gorey himself never uses that term in the Solod interview.)

From 1995 to his death in April 2000, Gorey was the subject of a cinéma vérité–style documentary directed by Christopher Seufert. (As of 2021, the film has been screened as a work-in-progress; the finished film and accompanying book are in post-production.) He was interviewed on Tribute to Edward Gorey, an hour-long community, public-access television cable show produced by artist and friend Joyce Kenney. He contributed his videos and personal thoughts. Gorey served as a judge at Yarmouth art shows and enjoyed activities at the local cable station, studying computer art and serving as a cameraman on many Yarmouth shows. His house, in Yarmouthport, Cape Cod, is the subject of a photography book entitled Elephant House: Or, the Home of Edward Gorey, with photographs and text by Kevin McDermott. The house is now the Edward Gorey House Museum.

Gorey left the bulk of his estate to a charitable trust benefiting cats and dogs, as well as other species, including bats and insects.

Style 

Gorey is typically described as an illustrator. His books may be found in the humor and cartoon sections of major bookstores, but books such as The Object Lesson have earned serious critical respect as works of surrealist art. His experimentation—creating books that were wordless, books that were literally matchbox-sized, pop-up books, books entirely populated by inanimate objects—complicates matters still further. As Gorey told Lisa Solod of The Boston Globe, "Ideally, if anything were any good, it would be indescribable." Gorey classified his own work as literary nonsense, the genre made most famous by Lewis Carroll and Edward Lear.

In response to being called gothic, he stated, "If you're doing nonsense it has to be rather awful, because there'd be no point. I'm trying to think if there's sunny nonsense. Sunny, funny nonsense for children—oh, how boring, boring, boring. As Schubert said, there is no happy music. And that's true, there really isn't. And there's probably no happy nonsense, either."

Bibliography 

Gorey wrote more than 100 books, including the following:

 The Unstrung Harp, Brown and Company, 1953
 The Listing Attic, Brown and Company, 1954
 The Doubtful Guest, Doubleday, 1957
 The Object-Lesson, Doubleday, 1958
 The Bug Book, Looking Glass Library, 1959
 The Fatal Lozenge: An Alphabet, Obolensky, 1960
 The Curious Sofa: A Pornographic Tale by Ogdred Weary, Astor-Honor, 1961
 The Hapless Child, Obolensky, 1961
 The Willowdale Handcar: Or, the Return of the Black Doll, Bobbs-Merrill Company, 1962
 The Beastly Baby, Fantod Press, 1962
 The Vinegar Works: Three Volumes of Moral Instruction, Simon & Schuster, 1963
 The Gashlycrumb Tinies
 The Insect God
 The West Wing
 The Wuggly Ump, Lippincott, 1963
 The Nursery Frieze, Fantod Press, 1964
 The Sinking Spell, Obolensky, 1964
 The Remembered Visit: A Story Taken from Life, Simon & Schuster, 1965
 Three Books from Fantod Press (1), Fantod Press, 1966
 The Evil Garden
 The Inanimate Tragedy
 The Pious Infant
 The Gilded Bat, Cape, 1967
 The Utter Zoo, Meredith Press, 1967
 The Other Statue, Simon & Schuster, 1968
 The Blue Aspic, Meredith Press, 1968
 The Epiplectic Bicycle, Dodd and Mead, 1969
 The Iron Tonic: Or, A Winter Afternoon in Lonely Valley, Albondocani Press, 1969
 Three Books from the Fantod Press (2), Fantod Press, 1970
 The Chinese Obelisks: Fourth Alphabet
 Donald Has a Difficulty
 The Osbick Bird
 The Sopping Thursday, Gotham Book Mart, 1970
 Three Books from the Fantod Press (3), Fantod Press, 1971
 The Deranged Cousins
 The Eleventh Episode
 The Untitled Book
 The Awdrey-Gore Legacy, 1972
 Leaves from a Mislaid Album, Gotham Book Mart, 1972
 The Abandoned Sock, Fantod Press, 1972
 A Limerick, Salt-Works Press, 1973
 The Lavender Leotard, Gotham Book Mart, 1973
 CatEgorY, Gotham Book Mart, 1973.
 The Lost Lions, Fantod Press, 1973
 The Green Beads, Albondocani Press, 1978
 The Glorious Nosebleed: Fifth Alphabet, Mead, 1975
 The Grand Passion: A Novel, Fantod Press, 1976
 The Broken Spoke, Mead, 1976
 The Loathsome Couple, Mead, 1977
 Gorey Games, Troubadour Press, 1979 (games designed by Larry Evans)
 Dancing Cats and Neglected Murderesses, Workman, 1980
 The Water Flowers, Congdon & Weed, 1982
 The Dwindling Party, Random House, 1982
 Gorey Cats, Troubadour Press, 1982 (with Malcolm Whyte and Nancie West Swanber)
 The Prune People, Albondocani Press, 1983
 Gorey Stories, 1983
 The Tunnel Calamity, Putnam's Sons, 1984
 The Eclectic Abecedarium, Adama Books, 1985
 The Prune People II, Albondocani Press, 1985
 The Improvable Landscape, Albondocani Press, 1986
 The Raging Tide: Or, The Black Doll's Imbroglio, Beaufort Books, 1987
 Q. R. V. (later retitled The Universal Solvent), Anne & David Bromer, 1989
 The Stupid Joke, Fantod Press, 1990
 The Fraught Settee, Fantod Press, 1990
 The Doleful Domesticity; Another Novel, Fantod Press, 1991
 La Balade Troublante, Fantod Press, 1991
 The Retrieved Locket, Fantod Press, 1994
 The Unknown Vegetable, Fantod Press, 1995
 The Just Dessert: Thoughtful Alphabet XI, Fantod Press, 1997
 Deadly Blotter: Thoughtful Alphabet XVII, Fantod Press, 1997
 The Haunted Tea-Cosy: A Dispirited and Distasteful Diversion for Christmas, Harcourt, Brace, Jovanovich, 1998
 The Headless Bust: A Melancholy Meditation on the False Millennium, Harcourt, Brace, Jovanovich, 1999

Many of Gorey's works were published obscurely and are difficult to find (and priced accordingly); however, the following four omnibus editions collect much of his material. Because his original books are rather short, these editions may contain 15 or more in each volume.

 Amphigorey, 1972 contains The Unstrung Harp, The Listing Attic, The Doubtful Guest, The Object-Lesson, The Bug Book, The Fatal Lozenge, The Hapless Child, The Curious Sofa, The Willowdale Handcar, The Gashlycrumb Tinies, The Insect God, The West Wing, The Wuggly Ump, The Sinking Spell, and The Remembered Visit
 Amphigorey Too, 1975 contains The Beastly Baby, The Nursery Frieze, The Pious Infant, The Evil Garden, The Inanimate Tragedy, The Gilded Bat, The Iron Tonic, The Osbick Bird, The Chinese Obelisks (bis), The Deranged Cousins, The Eleventh Episode, [The Untitled Book], The Lavender Leotard, The Disrespectful Summons, The Abandoned Sock, The Lost Lions, Story for Sara [by Alphonse Allais], The Salt Herring [by Charles Cros], Leaves from a Mislaid Album, and A Limerick
 Amphigorey Also, 1983 contains The Utter Zoo, The Blue Aspic, The Epiplectic Bicycle, The Sopping Thursday, The Grand Passion, Les Passementeries Horribles, The Eclectic Abecedarium, L'Heure bleue, The Broken Spoke, The Awdrey-Gore Legacy, The Glorious Nosebleed, The Loathsome Couple, The Green Beads, Les Urnes Utiles, The Stupid Joke, The Prune People, and The Tuning Fork
 Amphigorey Again, 2006 contains The Galoshes of Remorse, Signs of Spring, Seasonal Confusion, Random Walk, Category, The Other Statue, 10 Impossible Objects (abridged), The Universal Solvent (abridged), Scenes de Ballet, Verse Advice, The Deadly Blotter, Creativity, The Retrieved Locket, The Water Flowers, The Haunted Tea-Cosy, Christmas Wrap-Up, The Headless Bust, The Just Dessert, The Admonitory Hippopotamus, Neglected Murderesses, Tragedies Topiares, The Raging Tide, The Unknown Vegetable, Another Random Walk, Serious Life: A Cruise, Figbash Acrobate, La Malle Saignante, and The Izzard Book

He also illustrated more than 50 works by other authors, including Merrill Moore, Samuel Beckett, Edward Lear, John Bellairs, H. G. Wells, Alain-Fournier, Charles Dickens, T. S. Eliot, Hilaire Belloc (where new illustrations to Cautionary Tales for Children were published posthumously), Muriel Spark, Florence Parry Heide, John Updike, John Ciardi,  Felicia Lamport and Joan Aiken.

Pseudonyms 
Gorey was very fond of word games, particularly anagrams. He wrote many of his books under pseudonyms that usually were anagrams of his own name (most famously Ogdred Weary). Some of them are listed below, with the corresponding book title(s). Eduard Blutig is also a word game: "Blutig" is German (the language from which these two books purportedly were translated) for "bloody" or "gory".

 Ogdred Weary The Curious Sofa, The Beastly Baby
 Mrs. Regera Dowdy The Pious Infant, The Izzard Book
 Eduard Blutig The Evil Garden (translated from Der Böse Garten by Mrs. Regera Dowdy), The Tuning Fork (translated from Der Zeitirrthum by Mrs. Regera Dowdy)
 Raddory Gewe The Eleventh Episode
 Dogear Wryde The Broken Spoke/Cycling Cards
 E. G. Deadworry The Awdrey-Gore Legacy and his grandson G.E. Deadworry
 D. Awdrey-Gore The Toastrack Enigma, The Blancmange Tragedy, The Postcard Mystery, The Pincushion Affair, The Toothpaste Murder, The Dustwrapper Secret and The Teacosy Crime (Note: These books, although attributed to Awdrey-Gore in Gorey's book The Awdrey-Gore Legacy, were not really written). She is a parody of Agatha Christie.
 Waredo Dyrge The Awdrey-Gore Legacy parody of Hercule Poirot
 Edward Pig The Untitled Book
 Wardore Edgy SoHo Weekly News
 Madame Groeda Weyrd The Fantod Pack
 Dewda Yorger "The Deary Rewdgo Series for Intrepid Young Ladies (D.R. on the Great Divide, D.R. in the Yukon, D.R. at Baffin Bay, etc.)"
 Garrod Weedy - The Pointless Book

Legacy 
Gorey has become an iconic figure in the goth subculture. Events themed on his works and decorated in his characteristic style are common in the more Victorian-styled elements of the subculture, notably the Edwardian costume balls held annually in San Francisco and Los Angeles, which include performances based on his works. The "Edwardian" in this case refers less to the Edwardian period of history than to Gorey, whose characters are depicted as wearing fashion styles ranging from the mid-nineteenth century to the 1930s.

Among the authors influenced by Gorey's work is Daniel Handler, who, under the pseudonym "Lemony Snicket", wrote the gothic children's book series A Series of Unfortunate Events. Shortly before Gorey's death, Handler sent a copy of the series's first two novels to him, with a letter "saying how much I admired his work, and how much I hoped that he would forgive what I'd stolen from him."

Director Mark Romanek's music video for the Nine Inch Nails song "The Perfect Drug" was designed specifically to resemble a Gorey book, with familiar Gorey elements including oversized urns, topiary plants, and glum, pale characters in full Edwardian costume. Also, Caitlín R. Kiernan has published a short story entitled "A Story for Edward Gorey" (Tales of Pain and Wonder, 2000), which features Gorey's black doll.

A more direct link to Gorey's influence on the music world is evident in The Gorey End, an album recorded in 2003 by The Tiger Lillies and the Kronos Quartet. This album was a collaboration with Gorey, who liked previous work by The Tiger Lillies so much that he sent them a large box of his unpublished works, which were then adapted and turned into songs. Gorey died before hearing the finished album.

In 1976, jazz composer Michael Mantler recorded an album called The Hapless Child (Watt/ECM) with Robert Wyatt, Terje Rypdal, Carla Bley, and Jack DeJohnette. It contains musical adaptations of The Sinking Spell, The Object Lesson, The Insect God, The Doubtful Guest, The Remembered Visit, and The Hapless Child. The last three songs also have been published on his 1987 Live album with Jack Bruce, Rick Fenn, and Nick Mason.

The opening titles of the PBS series Mystery! are based on Gorey's art, in an animated sequence co-directed by Derek Lamb.

In the last few decades of his life, Gorey merchandise became quite popular, with stuffed dolls, cups, stickers, posters, and other items available at malls around the United States. In 2002, a book of his interviews entitled Ascending Peculiarity: Edward Gorey on Edward Gorey was released by author Karen Wilkin.

In 2007, The Jim Henson Company announced plans to produce a feature film based on The Doubtful Guest to be directed by Brad Peyton. No release date was given and there has been no further information since the announcement. The project was later announced again in 2021, with it now also being produced by Amblin Entertainment.

The online journal Goreyesque publishes artwork, stories, and poems in the spirit of Edward Gorey's work. The journal is co-sponsored by the Department of Creative Writing at Columbia College Chicago and Loyola University Chicago. Goreyesque was launched in tandem with the Chicago debut of two Gorey collections: Elegant Enigmas: The Art of Edward Gorey and G is for Gorey. The collections were shown at the Loyola University Museum of Art (LUMA) in Chicago, Illinois from February 15 to June 15, 2014. Goreyesque features the work of both emerging talents and seasoned professionals, such as writers Sam Weller and Joe Meno.

See also 

Contemporary American cartoonists with similar macabre style include:

 Charles Addams
 Gary Larson
 Lorin Morgan-Richards
 Gahan Wilson

References

Further reading 
 G Is for Gorey—C Is for Chicago; The Collection of Thomas Michalak. libguides.luc.edu.
 The World of Edward Gorey, Clifford Ross and Karen Wilkin, Henry N. Abrams Inc., 1996. Interview and monograph.
 The Strange Case of Edward Gorey, Alexander Theroux, Fantagraphics Books, 2000. Biography and reminiscence by Theroux, a friend of Gorey. An expanded edition was published in 2011.
 The Gorey Details. BBC Radio program compiled and presented by Philip Glassborow, including interviews with Andreas Brown of the Gotham Book Mart, actor Frank Langella (star of Gorey's Dracula on Broadway), Alison Lurie, Alex Hand, Jack Braginton Smith, Katherine Kellgren, and featuring David Suchet as the voice of Gorey.
 "All the Gorey Details", The Independent, by Philip Glassborow, May 2003.
 Born to Be Posthumous: The Eccentric Life and Mysterious Genius of Edward Gorey, Mark Dery, Little, Brown, 2018.
 Edward Gorey's Illustrated Covers for Literary Classics

External links 

 Official website of the Edward Gorey Charitable Trust
 Official website of the Edward Gorey House
 
 
 
 
 Edward Gorey Collection at the Harry Ransom Center
 Edward Gorey Collection at the Rare Book and Special Collections Division, Library of Congress
  (and multiple pseudonyms, linked)
 Andrew Alpern Collection of Edward Gorey at Columbia University Libraries
 Mystery! Edward Gorey interview from pbs.org
 
 Book cover illustrations at Edward Gorey Books (GoreyBooks.com)
 GOREY documentary film (2022, forthcoming)
 Edward Gorey Doubleday Anchor paperbacks 1953–1960
 

 
1925 births
2000 deaths
20th-century American male writers
20th-century American novelists
20th-century American short story writers
American cartoonists
American humorous poets
American LGBT writers
American literary critics
American male essayists
American male novelists
American male short story writers
American surrealist artists
American surrealist writers
Artists from Chicago
Asexual men
Harvard Advocate alumni
LGBT people from Illinois
Francis W. Parker School (Chicago) alumni
School of the Art Institute of Chicago alumni
United States Army personnel of World War II
United States Army soldiers
World Fantasy Award-winning artists
Writers of Gothic fiction
Writers who illustrated their own writing